Navigation Transit Markers are posts placed alongside a navigation to allow powered craft to check their speed. Examples of these markers can be found at several locations along the River Thames in England.

A navigation marker consists of a black and white ringed pole surmounted by a red open triangle. The configuration of the markers is made up of two pairs, each pair having one pole behind the other, and the pairs being separated by a set distance along the bank. Timing starts when the first two markers line up, and ends when the second pair line up. For a craft to be within the speed limit, it should take a minute or more to reach the second pair of markers after passing the first pair of markers. On the upper reaches of the Thames, the speed limit is 8 km per hour or 133.3 m per minute, and so the markers are set 133.3 m apart.

On the River Thames, there are markers on the reaches above Teddington Lock, Sunbury Lock, Cookham Lock, Sonning Lock, Day's Lock and Osney Lock.

See also

Locks on the River Thames
Nautical measured mile

References
 A User's Guide to the River Thames

Water transport in England
Geography of the River Thames